World Championship Pool 2004 (also known as 2004 World Championship Pool or simply World Championship Pool)
is a sports simulation video game developed in 2003 by Blade Interactive and released by Jaleco for PlayStation 2, Xbox, Windows, and GameCube.  The game features several variants of pool (pocket billiards), and simulated pro players.

Characters
Eleven simulations of real-life, world-class professional pool players appear, and are playable characters in the game:

1. Thorsten Hohmann, 2 Championships

2. Efren Reyes, 2 Championships

3. Earl Strickland, 3 Championships

4. Ralf Souquet, 2 Championships

5. Francisco Bustamante, 1 Championship

6. Johnny Archer, 2 Championships

7. Tony Drago, Snooker Legend

8. Steve Davis, Snooker Legend

9. Mika Immonen, 1 Championship

10. Marcus Chamat

11. Nick van den Berg, 1 Final

12. Chirs Melling, 2 Championships

13. Mick Hill, 6 Championship

14. Darren Appleton, 2 Championships

15. Carl Morris, 1 Championship

16. Keith Brewer, 1 Final

17. Gareth Potts, 3 Championships

18. Keith Jones

19. Ian Hubbard

20. Phil Harrison, 1 Championship

21. Lee Kendall, 2 Finals

22. Stephen Munro

23. Gareth Manning 

24. Yannick Beaufils, 1 Final

References

External links

2003 video games
PlayStation 2 games
Xbox games
Windows games
Cue sports video games
Jaleco games
Video games developed in the United Kingdom